Finland and Vietnam have established their official relations in January 1973. Finland has an embassy in Hanoi and a consulate in Ho Chi Minh City, while Vietnam has an embassy in Helsinki.

History
While the two countries established formal ties only in January 1973, the two countries carry some coincidences. Both Finland and Vietnam border gigantic and hostile neighbours Russia and China, having fought wars against both Russia and China in 20th century, with Finland fought the Winter War and Continuation War against the Soviets, while Vietnam fought against the Chinese in the Sino-Vietnamese War and later border conflicts, these wars which Finland and Vietnam fought against more powerful neighbours had been somewhat compared, especially with the use of citizen soldiers to delay advances of their enemies, and the casualties and traumas the two nations endured.

There are also some similarities in the policies played by both governments aftermath when it comes to relations with their gigantic neighbours. Finland's Paasikivi–Kekkonen doctrine and Vietnam's Three Nos principle are both used to enforce neutrality to avoid provocation whilst at the same time seek to engage with Western nations that could oppose Russia and China's ambitions.

Education relations
Finland has a great reputation for providing one of the best education system in the world, which the Vietnamese officials have long sought to study and emulate. There is a Finnish school in Ho Chi Minh City, which offers a Finnish-style education. There are also a huge number of Vietnamese students choosing Finland to study.

Economic relations
Vietnam and Finland are also keen in boosting trade relations, bilateral trade turnover rose by 61.2% year-on-year to US$285 million in the first six months of 2021 despite COVID-19 pandemic.

See also 
 Foreign relations of Finland 
 Foreign relations of Vietnam

References

Finland–Vietnam relations
Vietnam
Bilateral relations of Vietnam